Brook Ramble, also known as the James Crawford House, is a historic home located near Townsend, New Castle County, Delaware.  It was built about 1810, and is a -story, three-bay brick dwelling with an interior brick chimneys at the west gable ends. It has a slate covered gable roof. The main house measures approximately 28 feet by 33 feet and has a side passage plan. There is an original service wing measuring 27 feet by 17 feet. It is in the Federal style.

It was listed on the National Register of Historic Places in 1992.

References

Houses on the National Register of Historic Places in Delaware
Federal architecture in Delaware
Houses completed in 1810
Houses in New Castle County, Delaware
National Register of Historic Places in New Castle County, Delaware
1810 establishments in Delaware
Side passage plan architecture in the United States